Fairbank Township is one of sixteen townships in Buchanan County, Iowa, United States.  As of the 2000 census, its population was 1,774.

History
The first white child was born in Fairbank Township in 1855.

Geography 

According to the USGS, it contains three cemeteries: Amish, North Amish and Union.

References

External links 
 City-Data.com

Townships in Buchanan County, Iowa
Townships in Iowa